This is a list of films shot over three or more years. The list excludes projects comprising individual films not shot over a long period, such as the Up series, The Children of Golzow, or the Harry Potter series.

The Other Side of the Wind holds the record for a movie to be in production for the longest time: it was in production stage for 48 years (1970–2018).

See also 

 List of media notable for being in development hell

References

Longest production time